Aricanduva is a district in the subprefecture of the same name in the city of São Paulo, Brazil. It is located along the west bank of the Aricanduva River, which crosses the city from east to southeast. The name Aricanduva originated from one of the indigenous languages of Brazil known as Tupi and means "place where there are many palm trees of the airi species".

History
The Aricanduva district was administratively defined in 1999 as part of a general reorganization of the districts and subprefectures of São Paulo.  It is believed the district was founded in the earlier 1900s (1902 or 1905).

Transportation
The district is serviced by several SPTrans bus lines.

See also 
 Roman Catholic Archdiocese of São Paulo

References

Districts of São Paulo